Det som varit ÄR is a Viking rock album, released by Hel in 2003, from the label Hel Records.

Track listing

 Doften av ångest
 Spikar i mitt hjärta
 För evigt farväl
 Vildjursjakt
 Moders barm
 Skrivet i mitt blod
 Två världar
 Den frälste
 Timglas
 Fria Norr

2003 albums